Isdhoo as a place name may refer to:
 Isdhoo (Gaafu Dhaalu Atoll) (Republic of Maldives)
 Isdhoo (Laamu Atoll) (Republic of Maldives)